Horace J. Poinier (October 28, 1810 – April 19, 1894) was an American politician who served as the Mayor of Newark from 1854 to 1857.

References

1810 births
1894 deaths
Mayors of Newark, New Jersey
New Jersey Whigs
19th-century American politicians